The following is a list of emergency organizations operating in the Province of British Columbia, Canada.

Federal Agencies

Department of National Defence 
 Canadian Forces

Fisheries and Oceans Canada 
 Canadian Coast Guard
 Royal Canadian Marine Search & Rescue (RCM-SAR) (Formerly Canadian Coast Guard Auxiliary)
 Canadian Coast Guard Auxiliary (Operating as RCM-SAR)

Public Safety Canada 

 RCMP "E" Division
 Correctional Service Canada

Public Health Agency Canada 
 Quarantine and Migration Health Program
 Health Emergency Response Teams

Provincial Agencies

Ministry of Public Safety and Solicitor General 
 Law Enforcement

 BC Corrections Branch
 Emergency Management BC 
 Emergency Support Services
 PEP Air
 Royal Canadian Marine Search and Rescue (RCMSAR)
 Ground Search and Rescue (SAR)
 List of Volunteer SAR teams in BC:

 100 Mile & District Search and Rescue
 Alberni Valley Rescue Squad
 All Island Search and Rescue
 Anahim Lake Search and Rescue Association
 Arrowsmith Search and Rescue Society
 Barriere Search and Rescue Association
 Bella Coola Valley Search and Rescue
 British Columbia Cave Rescue
 Bulkley Valley Search and Rescue
 Burns Lake Search and Rescue
 Campbell River Search and Rescue Society
 Castlegar Search and Rescue
 Central Cariboo Search and Rescue
 Central Fraser Valley Search and Rescue Society
 Central Okanagan Search & Rescue Society
 Chetwynd Search and Rescue
 Chilliwack Search and Rescue
 Columbia Valley Search and Rescue
 Comox Valley Ground Search and Rescue
 Coquitlam Search and Rescue
 Cowichan Search and Rescue
 Cranbrook and District Search and Rescue
 Dease Lake Search and Rescue
 Elkford Search and Rescue
 Fernie Search and Rescue
 Fort Nelson Search and Rescue
 Fort St. James Search and Rescue
 Gabriola Island Search and Rescue
 Golden & District Search and Rescue Society
 Grand Forks Search and Rescue
 Hope Volunteer Search and Rescue Group
 Juan de Fuca Ground Search and Rescue
 Kamloops Search and Rescue Society
 Kaslo Search and Rescue
 Kent Harrison Search & Rescue
 Keremeos Search and Rescue
 Kimberley Search and Rescue
 Kitimat Search and Rescue

 Ladysmith Search and Rescue
 Lake Cowichan Search and Rescue
 Lions Bay Search and Rescue
 Logan Lake Search and Rescue
 Mayne Island Search and Rescue
 Metchosin Search and Rescue
 Mission Search and Rescue
 Nakusp Search and Rescue
 Nanaimo Search and Rescue Society
 Nelson Search and Rescue
 Nicola Valley Search and Rescue
 North Peace Search and Rescue
 North Shore Rescue
 Oliver - Osoyoos Search and Rescue
 Pemberton District Search and Rescue
 Pender Island Search and Rescue
 Peninsula Emergency Measures Organization
 Penticton and District Emergency Program Society
 Port McNeill Search and Rescue
 Powell River Search and Rescue
 Prince George Search and Rescue
 Prince Rupert Search and Rescue
 Princeton Ground Search and Rescue
 Revelstoke Search and Rescue
 Ridge Meadows Search and Rescue
 Rossland Search and Rescue
 Shuswap Search and Rescue
 South Columbia Search and Rescue
 South Peace Emergency Response Team
 Sparwood Search and Rescue
 Squamish Emergency Program
 Sunshine Coast Search and Rescue Society
 Surrey Search and Rescue Society
 Terrace Search and Rescue
 Tumbler Ridge Search and Rescue
 Valemount/McBride/Robson Valley Search and Rescue
 Vernon Search and Rescue Group Society
 Victoria Search and Rescue
 Wells Gray Search and Rescue
 West Chilcotin Search and Rescue
 Westcoast Inland Search and Rescue
 Whistler Search and Rescue

 Emergency Radio Communications
 Road Rescue
 Office of Fire Commissioner
 Fire & Rescue Departments
 BC Coroners Service

Ministry of Health 
 British Columbia Ambulance Service
 Provincial Air Ambulance Coordination Centre

Municipal/Regional Agencies 
 E-Comm, 9-1-1 call and dispatch centre for BC
 North Island 911 Corporation, provides 9-1-1 service to North Vancouver Island
 Victoria Operations Communication Centre provides 9-1-1 service to Greater Victoria
 VECTOR, Vancouver Emergency Community Telecommunications Organization
 VEMA, Vancouver Emergency Management Agency (formerly Office of Emergency Management)
 VictoriaReady, (formerly Victoria Emergency Management Agency)
 District of Saanich Emergency Program
 PEMO, Peninsula Emergency Measures Organization

Other Agencies 
 Salvation Army
 Canadian Red Cross
 St. John Ambulance Canada
 Canadian Lifeboat Institution - Steveston BC
 Roberts Bank Lifeboat - Delta BC
 Emergency Social Services Association

Emergency services in Canada
Organizations based in British Columbia